The Mondropolon language is a West Manus language spoken by approximately 300 people on north-central Manus Island, Manus Province of Papua New Guinea. Its speakers also use Kurti. It has SVO word order.

References

External links 
 Kaipuleohone has archived materials on Modropolon including written and recorded materials

Manus languages
Languages of Manus Province
Subject–verb–object languages